Lindsay Davenport and Lisa Raymond were the defending champions and successfully defended their title, by defeating Meghann Shaughnessy and Paola Suárez 6–2, 6–4 in the final.

Seeds

Draw

Draw

References

External links
 Official results archive (ITF)
 Official results archive (WTA)

Porsche Tennis Grand Prix Doubles
2002 Women's Doubles